Skåbu Church is a parish church of the Church of Norway in Nord-Fron Municipality in Innlandet county, Norway. It is located in the village of Skåbu. It is the church for the Skåbu parish which is part of the Nord-Gudbrandsdal prosti (deanery) in the Diocese of Hamar. The brown, wooden church was built in a cruciform design in 1927 using plans drawn up by the architect Knut Villa. The church seats about 160 people.

History
The first church in Skåbu was built during the 13th century, possibly the year 1235. The earliest existing historical records of the church date back to the year 1590, but the church was old by that time. The church was likely closed during the 1600s and the people of the Skåbu area had to travel to the nearby Kvikne Church. In the early 1900s, the parish began considering a new church in Skåbu. The new church was designed by Knut Villa and it was a wooden cruciform building. It was completed in 1927.

See also
List of churches in Hamar

References

Nord-Fron
Churches in Innlandet
Cruciform churches in Norway
Wooden churches in Norway
20th-century Church of Norway church buildings
Churches completed in 1927
1927 establishments in Norway